The economy of Sierra Leone is $4.082 billion by gross domestic product as of 2018. Since the end of the Sierra Leone Civil War in 2002, the economy is gradually recovering with a gross domestic product growth rate between 4 and 7%. In 2008 it in PPP ranked between 147th by World Bank, and 153rd by CIA, largest in the world.

Sierra Leone's economic development has always been hampered by an overdependence on mineral exploitation.  Successive governments and the population as a whole have always believed that "diamonds and gold" are sufficient generators of foreign currency earnings and lure for investment.

As a result, large scale agriculture of commodity products, industrial development and sustainable investments have been neglected by governments. The economy could thus be described as one which is "exploitative" - a rentier state - and based upon the extraction of unsustainable resources or non-reusable assets.

Two-thirds of the population of Sierra Leone are directly involved in subsistence agriculture. Agriculture accounted for 58 percent national GDP in 2007.

Economic history
This is a chart of trend of gross domestic product of Sierra Leone at market prices estimated by the International Monetary Fund and EconStats with figures in millions of Sierra Leones.

Current GDP per capita of Sierra Leone grew 32% in the 1960s, reaching a peak growth of 107% in the 1970s. But this proved unsustainable and it consequently shrank by 52% in the 1980s and a further 10% in the 1990s.

The mean wage was US$0.32 per hour in 2009.

Economic sectors

Agriculture

Two-thirds of the population of Sierra Leone are directly involved in subsistence agriculture. Agriculture accounted for 58 percent national Gross Domestic Product (GDP) in 2007.

Agriculture is the largest employer with 80 percent of the population working in the sector. Rice is the most important staple crop in Sierra Leone with 85 percent of farmers cultivating rice during the rainy season and an annual consumption of 76 kg per person.

Mining

Rich in minerals, Sierra Leone has relied on the mining sector in general, and diamonds in particular, for its economic base. In the 1970s and early 1980s, economic growth rate slowed because of a decline in the mining sector. Financially disadvantageous exchange rates and government budget deficits led to sizable balance-of-payments deficits and inflation.

Certain policy responses to external factors as well as implementations of aid projects and maintenance have led to a general decline in economic activity and a serious degradation of economic infrastructures. Sierra Leone's short-term prospects depend upon continued adherence to International Monetary Fund programs and continued external assistance.

Telecommunications 

Radio is the most-popular and most-trusted media source in Sierra Leone, with 72% of people in the country listening to the radio daily. Sierra Leone is home to one government-owned national radio station and roughly two dozen private radio stations, as well as one government-owned and one private TV station.

Telephone and telegraph services are marginal, but improving. Internet usage is low, reaching just 1.3% of the population in 2012, but improving with growth in 3G mobile cellular data services and the mid-2011 arrival of the ACE international fiber-optic cable system in Freetown.

Tourism 

According to the International Labour Organization, approximately 8,000 Sierra Leoneans are employed in the tourism industry, with a growing number of jobs expected to be created in the future. The main entrance point is Freetown International Airport, where transport to and from has been problematic.  The main attractions for tourist in Sierra Leone are the beaches, nature reserves and mountains.

Transport 

Because of widespread poverty, high petroleum prices and a large portion of the population residing in small communities, walking is often the preferred method of transportation in Sierra Leone. There are 11,700 kilometres (7,270  mi) of highway in Sierra Leone, of which 936 km (582 mi) are paved.

There are 800 km (497 mi) of waterways in Sierra Leone, of which 600 km (373 mi) are navigable year-round. Major ports of Sierra Leone include: Bonthe, Freetown and Pepel. Queen Elizabeth II Quay in Freetown represents the country's only deep water port facility capable of berthing large-hulled cargo or military vessels.

There are ten airports in Sierra Leone, of which one - Lungi International Airport in Freetown -  has a paved runway in excess of 3000m in length. There are two heliports in the country.

Trade and investment

Mineral exports remain Sierra Leone's principal foreign exchange earner. Sierra Leone is a major producer of gem-quality diamonds. Though rich in this resource, the country has historically struggled to manage its exploitation and export. Annual production estimates range between $70–$250 million; however, only a fraction of that passes through formal export channels (1999: $1.2 million; 2000: $16 million; 2001: projections $25 million). The balance is smuggled out and has been used to finance rebel activities in the region, money laundering, arms purchases, and financing of other illicit activities, leading some to characterize Sierra Leone's diamonds as a "conflict resource."

Recent efforts on the part of the country to improve the management of the export trade have met with some success. In October 2000, a new UN-approved export certification system for exporting diamonds from Sierra Leone was put into place that led to a dramatic increase in legal exports. In 2001, the Government of Sierra Leone created a mining community development fund, which returns a portion of diamond export taxes to diamond mining communities. The fund was created to raise local communities' stake in the legal diamond trade.

Sierra Leone has one of the world's largest deposits of rutile, a titanium ore used as paint pigment and welding rod coatings. Sierra Rutile Limited, fully owned by Nord Resources of the United States, began commercial mining operations near Bonthe in early 1979. Sierra Rutile was then the largest non-petroleum U.S. investment in West Africa. The export of 88,000 tons realized $75 million for the country in 1990.

The company and the Government of Sierra Leone concluded a new agreement on the terms of the company's concession in Sierra Leone in 1990. Rutile and bauxite mining operations were suspended when rebels invaded the mining sites in 1995. Negotiations for reactivation of rutile and bauxite mining are in progress. The U.S. interest in the company has been reduced to 25%.

Since independence, the Government of Sierra Leone has encouraged foreign investment, although the business climate suffers from uncertainty and a shortage of foreign exchange because of civil conflicts. Investors are protected by an agreement that allows for arbitration under the 1965 World Bank Convention. Legislation provides for transfer of interest, dividends, and capital.

Currency and central bank 

The currency is the leone. The central bank of the country is the Bank of Sierra Leone which is in the capital, Freetown. The country operates a floating exchange rate system, and foreign currencies can be exchanged at any of the commercial banks, recognized foreign exchange bureaux and most hotels. Credit card use is limited in Sierra Leone, though they may be used at some hotels and restaurants. There are a few internationally linked automated teller machines that accept Visa cards in Freetown operated by ProCredit Bank.

Membership of international economic bodies 
Sierra Leone is a member of the Economic Community of West African States (ECOWAS). With Liberia and Guinea, it formed the Mano River Union (MRU) customs union, primarily designed to implement development projects and promote regional economic integration.

The MRU has so far been inactive because of domestic problems and internal and cross-border conflicts in all three countries. The future of the MRU depends on the ability of its members to deal with the fallout from these internal and regional problems.

Sierra Leone is a member of the WTO.

Statistics
GDP:
purchasing power parity - $11.55 billion (2017 est.)

GDP - real growth rate:
3.7% (2017 est.)

GDP - per capita:
$1,600 (2017 est.)

Gross national saving: 
10% of GDP (2017 est.)

GDP - composition by sector:
agriculture:
60.7% (2017 est.) 
industry:
6.5% (2017 est.) 
services:
32.9% (2017 est.)

Population below poverty line::
70.2% (2004 est.)

Distribution of family income - Gini index:
34 (2011)

Inflation rate (consumer prices):
18.2% (2017 est.)

Labor force:
2.972 million (2017 est.)

Labor force - by occupation:
agriculture:
61.1% (2014 est.) 
industry:
5.5% (2014 est.) 
services:
33.4% (2014 est.)

Unemployment rate:
15% (2017 est.)

Budget:
revenues:
562 million (2017 est.) 
expenditures:
846.4 million (2017 est.)

Budget surplus (+) or deficit (-):
-7.9% (of GDP) (2017 est.)

Public debt: 
63.9% of GDP (2017 est.) 
 
Industries:
diamond mining; iron ore, rutile and bauxite mining; small-scale manufacturing (beverages, textiles, footwear)

Industrial production growth rate:
15.5% (2017 est.)

electrification: total population: 5% (2013)

electrification: urban areas: 11% (2013)

electrification: rural areas: 1% (2013)

Electricity - production:
300 million kWh  (2016 est.)

Electricity - production by source:
fossil fuel:
23%
hydro:
51%
nuclear:
0%
other renewable:
26% (2017)

Electricity - consumption:
279 million kWh  (2016 est.)

Electricity - exports:
0 kWh  (2016 est.)

Electricity - imports:
0 kWh  (2016 est.)

Agriculture - products:
rice, coffee, cocoa, palm kernels, palm oil, peanuts, cashews; poultry, cattle, sheep, pigs; fish

Exports:
$808.4 million  (2017 est.)

Exports - commodities:
iron ore, diamonds, rutile, cocoa, coffee, fish

Exports - partners:
Cote dIvoire 37.7%, Belgium 20.5%, US 15.7%, China 10.2%, Netherlands 6.1% (2017)

Imports:
$1.107 billion  (2017 est.)

Imports - commodities:
foodstuffs, machinery and equipment, fuels and lubricants, chemicals

Imports - partners:
China 11.5%, US 9.2%, Belgium 8.8%, UAE 7.7%, India 7.4%, Turkey 5.2%, Senegal 5.1%, Netherlands 4.3% (2017)

Debt - external:
$1.615 billion  (31 December 2017 est.)

Reserves of foreign exchange and gold:
$478 million  (31 December 2017 est.)

See also 
 Extractive industries
 United Nations Economic Commission for Africa

References

External links
 
 Sierra Leone latest trade data on ITC Trade Map
 CIA World Factbook

 
Sierra Leone
Sierra Leone
Blood diamonds